In certain jurisdictions, police prosecutors are employed by the police, as counsel for the prosecution, to present cases in court.

Australia
In Australia, all States and Territories (other than the Australian Capital Territory) employ Police Prosecutors to work in their summary courts. These police prosecutors are almost exclusively sworn police officers who are trained to act as advocates in summary criminal prosecutions. In Western Australia the police prosecutors work in concert with that state's Director of Public Prosecutions. Some police prosecutors hold legal qualifications; however, this is not a requirement to perform the role.

New Zealand
In the judicial system of New Zealand, a police prosecutor is a lawyer employed by the police to present cases in District Court, as the counsel for the prosecution. This may be a sworn member of the police (normally a sergeant) or, in larger courts, a civilian lawyer employed as a non-sworn member of the police. In smaller courts, the police prosecutors will normally consist entirely of sworn officers, while in larger courts a combination of sworn and non-sworn prosecutors will be employed.

Denmark
The Chief Constable is public prosecutor in the first instance and thus responsible for the prosecution (investigation and prosecution, as well as conduct of criminal proceedings in the courts). The Chief Constable is also the chief of the local police. The Chief Constable is usually a trained lawyer, but there is no legal requirement for this. A Chief Prosecutor, a trained lawyer, assists the Chief Constable with the function as prosecutor. Subordinate prosecutor, all of whom are trained lawyers, assists the Chief Prosecutor. As public prosecutor the Chief Constable is subordinate to the State Attorneys and the Attorney General.

Norway
Police prosecutors in Norway, who are trained lawyers, are uniformed, sworn police officers. They are leading police investigations in criminal cases; decides the issue of prosecution in criminal cases, including whether to prosecute, charge, issue a citation, or dismiss the case; they are also presenting the criminal cases in first instance. As prosecutors, the police prosecutors are part of the Norwegian Prosecuting Authority, and are subordinate to the State Attorneys. In Norway, it is argued that the integration of prosecution with the police, creates an organizational closeness between police investigators and public prosecutors which improves the quality of, and facilitates the decision-making process in, criminal investigations.

References

Law enforcement in New Zealand
Legal professions

Law enforcement in Australia